Helessa, Or The Azalea Azaled, the Fox Foxed, the Sea Rocked... (a Laz maritime movie-novel, performed as a chronicle of the last journey of the feluka Kirbish, or, if you like, as an animated picture of the Laz artist, Hasan Helimishi) (ჰელესა, ანუ ელი ელობდა, მელი მელობდა, ზღვა ფოფინობდა...) is a 2012 Georgian Movie-novel by author Miho Mosulishvili.

Logline
Taking advantage of May Kirbishi’s love, Yashar Badishi tries to uncover the set of directions of making the Kirbishi clan mysterious drug with the aim of selling the recipe to wealthy foreigners, Helen Meyers and Alfred Antopoulos.

Outline
The oldest family of the Laz people from Sarpi, the Kirbishi family, possesses the recipe of making indispensable medicine curing people.
The Red Flower of Medea is the herb used by the Kirbishi family for making indespansable ointment, as follows:
For several centuries they have gone to sea on their felucca sailing boat and grown this herb in the earthware pot on the deck to prevent disclosure of the mystery of their drug.

Besides, medicine is made with the arrangement of mysterious rituals, and to that end, it is necessary to visit of Constanta, the hamlet of Makriali in the Laz district of Turkey, and Gonio Fortress, the venues where the King of Colchis, Aeetes, laid to rest the parts of the remains of Absyrtus killed and fractured by Medea and Jason.

Yashar Badishi tries to uncover the mystery of this drug aiming at selling this recipe to the wealthy foreigners, Helen Mayers and Alfred Antopoulos, and to that end he goes to any lengths using close relationship with the Kirbishi family and even love of May Kirbishi. This is the reason of the rage from our Lord expressed through storms and gales.

Next year May Kirbishi having lost her relatives again goes to the sea on Kirbishi sail felucca and continues time-honored business of the family – and as a backdrop one can hear a song of their ancestors Helessa. This movie novel was conceived as animated drawings of the gifted Laz artist, Hasan Helimishi. Helessa tells us on the mystery that is part of your soul to be saved even at the expense of your life.

Characters
 Phoka Kirbishi, Papu (grandpa in the Laz language), 60, with one leg.
 May, Phoka’s daughter from his first deceased wife Nadie, 20.
 Ucha, nicknamed Mshiridon (in Laz, a swallow), Phoka’s son, 10.
 Meriem-Havana, wife of Phoka Kirbishi, mother of Ucha, step-mother to May, 55, Jinji (fortune-teller in Laz).
 Alfred Antopoulos, businessman from Vancouver, 60.
 Helen Meyer, wife of Alfred Antopoulos, 65, loves a doll Klabautermann.
 Yashar Badishi, nicknamed Swimming Island, has his own pontoon boat, 25.
 Sebastian Radu (Maparvelishi), a fisherman from the Laz hamlet of Lazu which is located to the south of the seaport Constanta.
 Ilfan Shishmanishi, captain of the Turkish coastguard patrol boat.
 Khatije Shishmanishi, mother of Ilfan, 70.
Also Turkish and Georgian Laz people, and others.

Awards
 August 27, 2012 - Win Level: Silver Award publishing house Ustari for movie-novel Helessa+synopsis on The Summit Marketing Effectiveness Award (Summit MEA) in Category: Lower Budget
 The novel Helessa became a nominee for the 2013 Saba Literary Prize.

Release details
 2012 — Ustari Publishing

References

External links
 Helessa Or Eli Elobda, Meli  Melobda, Sea buzzing…( georgian charm)
 HELESSA
 Helessa (Trailer of movie novel) 
 Helesa Yalesa - ჰელესა ჲალესა
 Helessa By Mixo Mosulišvili
 Helesa : Anu eli elobda...

Literature of Georgia (country)
2012 novels
21st-century Georgian novels
Georgian magic realism novels
Works by Miho Mosulishvili